Miloje Preković (born 7 June 1991) is a Serbian football goalkeeper who plays for Dinamo Samarqand.

Club career

Košice
He made his debut for Košice in a home fixture against Spartak Trnava on 27 April 2011. In this match he had conceded three goals.

Honours
Mladost Lučani
Serbian First League: 2013–14

References

External links

MFK Košice profile 

1991 births
Living people
People from Aranđelovac
Serbian footballers
Association football goalkeepers
OFK Mladenovac players
FK Mladost Lučani players
FK Sloga Kraljevo players
FC VSS Košice players
FK Iskra Borčice players
FK Inđija players
FK Voždovac players
Slovak Super Liga players
2. Liga (Slovakia) players
FC Yenisey Krasnoyarsk players
Serbian expatriate footballers
Expatriate footballers in Slovakia
Serbian expatriate sportspeople in Slovakia
Expatriate footballers in Russia
Serbian expatriate sportspeople in Russia